Gianluca Musacci (born 1 April 1987) is an Italian footballer who plays as a midfielder for Serie D club U.S.D. Real Forte dei Marmi-Querceta.

Career

Empoli
Born in Viareggio, Tuscany, Musacci started his career at Tuscan club Empoli. During the 2010–11 season, he often partnered with Davide Moro and/or Mirko Valdifiori in a 3 (or 2)-man midfield, in a defensive midfield role.

Parma and Spezia loans
Musacci moved on loan to Parma for €300,000 in August 2011 (with an option to purchase) and secured a permanent deal in a co-ownership arrangement in July 2012 in 5-year contract, for €400,000 transfer fee. In January 2013 Parma signed Musacci outright for another €500,000. He was immediately loaned to Spezia for €400,000, with Spezia receiving payment in the form of €200,000 from Parma at the end of season.

Padova and Frosinone loans
On 7 August 2013 he was signed by Serie B club Calcio Padova in temporary deal. On 21 August 2014 he was signed by Frosinone.

Paganese
On 19 July 2018, he signed a two-year contract with Serie C club Paganese. On 2 November 2018, he was released from his contract by mutual consent.

Footnotes

References

External links 
Gianluca Musacci's profile on soccernet

1987 births
Living people
People from Viareggio
Italian footballers
Association football midfielders
Empoli F.C. players
U.S. Massese 1919 players
Parma Calcio 1913 players
Spezia Calcio players
Calcio Padova players
Frosinone Calcio players
F.C. Pro Vercelli 1892 players
Catania S.S.D. players
A.C.R. Messina players
U.S. Viterbese 1908 players
Paganese Calcio 1926 players
Serie A players
Serie B players
Serie C players
Serie D players
Sportspeople from the Province of Lucca
Footballers from Tuscany